is a Japanese figure who is said to have established Ise Shrine, where the Sun Goddess, Amaterasu Omikami is enshrined. Yamatohime-no-mikoto is recorded as being the daughter of Emperor Suinin, Japan's 11th Emperor.

Traditional historical view
Legend says that about 2,000 years ago, Emperor Suinin ordered his daughter, Princess Yamatohime-no-mikoto, to set out and find a suitable permanent location from which to hold ceremonies for Amaterasu Ōmikami. Prior to this, Amaterasu Ōmikami had been worshiped within the Imperial Palace at Yamato, before a temporary location was created in the eastern Nara Basin. Yamatohime-no-mikoto is said to have set out from Mt. Miwa and wandered for 20 years through the regions of Ōmi and Mino in search of a suitable location.

When she arrived at Ise, she is said to have heard the voice of Amaterasu Ōmikami saying that she wanted to live forever in the richly abundant area of Ise, near the mountains and the sea, and it was here that Yamatohime-no-mikoto established Naiku, the Inner Shrine.

Jien records that during the reign of Emperor Suinin, the first High Priestess (saiō, also known as saigū) was appointed to serve at Ise Shrine.

Later, during the reign of Emperor Keikō, she gave her dress then holy sword Kusanagi-no-tsurugi to Yamato Takeru.

Alternate historical perspectives

Some sources point out the parallels between Yamatohime-no-mikoto and Queen Himiko, a female ruler of Japan referred to in 3rd-century Chinese sources, namely the Records of Three Kingdoms and the Wajinden. Himiko was recorded as an unmarried queen and priestess, whose name means "sun child", or "sun daughter". Parallels can be drawn between Yamatohime-no-mikoto's role as both princess and priestess and the descriptions of Himiko, as well as the meaning of Himiko's name and that of the role of Yamatohime-no-mikoto as priestess and descendant of the sun goddess, or "daughter of the sun". Queen Himiko is recorded as having ruled the land of "Yamatai", whereas Yamatohime-no-mikoto left her home of Yamato to establish Ise Shrine.

The nature of Queen Himiko has been a point of great debate since the late Edo period, with other theories linking her with Empress Jingū or even a real person upon whom the myth of the sun goddess Amaterasu was built. As the earliest extant Japanese sources of information about  Yamatohime-no-mikoto date from the Kojiki in the early 8th century, it remains difficult to see how the historical figure of Yamatohime-no-mikoto can be delineated in fuller depth or with a sense of better verified accuracy.

Ceremonies
A Shinto ceremony is conducted on May 5 and November 5 each year at the sanctuary of Yamatohime-no-miya, near Ise Shrine, to celebrate the contribution of Yamatohime-no-mikoto in the establishment of the shrine.

See also
 Saiō

Notes

References
 Brown, Delmer and Ichiro Ishida, eds. (1979). [ Jien, c.1220],  Gukanshō; "The Future and the Past: a translation and study of the 'Gukanshō,' an interpretive history of Japan written in 1219" translated from the Japanese and edited by Delmer M. Brown & Ichirō Ishida. Berkeley: University of California Press.  
 Farris, William Wayne. (1999). "Sacred Texts and Buried Treasures: Issues in the Historical Archaeology of Ancient Japan," Monumenta Nipponica, Vol. 54, No. 1, pp. 123–126.
 Titsingh, Isaac. (1834). [Siyun-sai Rin-siyo/Hayashi Gahō, 1652]. Nipon o daï itsi ran; ou, Annales des empereurs du Japon, tr. par M. Isaac Titsingh avec l'aide de plusieurs interprètes attachés au comptoir hollandais de Nangasaki; ouvrage re., complété et cor. sur l'original japonais-chinois, accompagné de notes et précédé d'un Aperçu d'histoire mythologique du Japon, par M. J. Klaproth.  Paris: Oriental Translation Society of Great Britain and Ireland.... Click link for digitized, full-text copy of this book (in French)
 Varley, H. Paul, ed. (1980). [ Kitabatake Chikafusa, 1359], Jinnō Shōtōki ("A Chronicle of Gods and Sovereigns: Jinnō Shōtōki of Kitabatake Chikafusa" translated by H. Paul Varley). New York: Columbia University Press.

External links
Ise Shrine - Naiku, official website

Shinto kami
Saigū
Deified Japanese people
Japanese princesses
Japanese priestesses
Ancient Japanese priestesses
Daughters of emperors